Keshavarzi Bank (Bank-e-Keshavarzi), (meaning: Bank of Agriculture) also known as Agribank, is a major Iranian banking establishment offering retail and commercial services. The company was established in 1933 and as a Farming and Industrial Bank. Currently, the bank  serves as the only specialized financial institution in the agricultural sector that holds over 1800 branches nationwide and finances nearly 70% of the Iranian agricultural sector.

While established in Tehran, the bank operates throughout the nation with over 16,000 employees and 1800 branches. The bank currently specializes in providing credit facilities for agricultural development and other rural development activities.

Operations

The bank currently operates throughout the country, housing a total of 1800 branches. In addition to offering short and fixed deposit accounts for domestic and overseas clients, the bank provides  letters of credit, treasury, currency exchange, corporate loans syndication, financial advisory and electronic banking services.

In 2003 a pilot branch was exclusively designed in Tehran to service teens exclusively.  Currently, there are 85 branches across Tehran holding special windows for services offered to children and young people. Similar windows have recently been opened in provincial directorates.

In 2009, the bank was awarded the Association of Development Financing Institutions of Asia and the Pacific's award for agricultural and environmental development.

See also

Agriculture in Iran
Banking in Iran
Privatization in Iran
Tehran Stock Exchange

References

External links

Banks of Iran
Banks established in 1937
Companies listed on the Tehran Stock Exchange
1937 establishments in Iran
Iranian entities subject to the U.S. Department of the Treasury sanctions